Karl Gunnar Alfred Karlsson-Tjörnebo (23 March 1927 – 15 March 2009) was a Swedish long-distance runner who specialized in the 3000 metres steeplechase. He competed at the Olympic Games three times, with a twelfth place in 1952, a fifth place in 1960 and failed to reach the final in 1956. At home, he won six national championships between 1951 and 1961, and set four Swedish records in his main event.

References

1927 births
2009 deaths
Swedish male long-distance runners
Swedish male steeplechase runners
Olympic athletes of Sweden
Athletes (track and field) at the 1952 Summer Olympics
Athletes (track and field) at the 1956 Summer Olympics
Athletes (track and field) at the 1960 Summer Olympics
People from Höör Municipality